Rupert Matthews may refer to:

 Rupe Matthews (1888–1966), Australian rules footballer for University
 Rupert Matthews (born 1961), British Conservative Party politician and writer on the paranormal